Peter Baldwin (born December 22, 1956) is a professor of history at the University of California, Los Angeles and a philanthropist. He was educated at Harvard (MA and PhD, both in History 1980 and 1986),  and Yale (BA Philosophy and History, 1978). He has written several books about Europe.

Career
A study of the state of trans-Atlantic relations between the United States and Europe from Oxford University Press was published in late 2009, entitled The Narcissism of Minor Differences: How America and Europe are Alike. In 2014 he published The Copyright Wars: Three Centuries of Trans-Atlantic Battle.

Philanthropy

Baldwin co-founded the Arcadia Fund in 2001 with his wife Lisbet Rausing. As of March 2020, the Fund has made grant commitments of over $678 million to charities and scholarly institutions globally that preserve cultural heritage and the environment and promote open access. Arcadia-funded projects include the Endangered Languages Documentation Programme at SOAS, the Endangered Archives Programme at the British Library and Fauna & Flora International's Halcyon Land and Sea fund.  Baldwin and Rausing are listed as one of the biggest benefactors to the Wikimedia Foundation and donated $5 million to the Wikimedia endowment in 2017 after joining its advisory board.

Rausing and Baldwin founded Lund Trust. Since 2002 Lund Trust has given more than $66.6 million to charities in the UK and internationally.

Publications
The Politics of Social Solidarity: Class Bases of the European Welfare State, 1875-1975 (Cambridge University Press, 1990)
Reworking the Past: Hitler, the Holocaust and the Historians' Debate, edited with an introduction (Beacon Press, 1990)
Contagion and the State in Europe, 1830-1930 (Cambridge University Press, 1999)
Disease and Democracy: The Industrialized World Faces AIDS (University of California Press, Berkeley, and the Milbank Memorial Fund, New York, 2005)
The Narcissism of Minor Differences: How America and Europe Are Alike (Oxford University Press, 2009)
 The Copyright Wars: Three Centuries of Trans-Atlantic Battle (Princeton University Press, 2014)
 Command and Persuade: Crime, Law, and the State across History (MIT Press 2021)
 First Wave: Why the Coronavirus was tackled so differently across the globe (Cambridge University Press, 2021)
 Athena Unbound:Why and How Scholarly Knowledge Should Be Free (The MIT Press, 2023)

References

External links 
Page at UCLA, detailing various publications.
Academic publications

Living people
Harvard Graduate School of Arts and Sciences alumni
Yale College alumni
University of California, Los Angeles faculty
1956 births
American historians
American philanthropists